Anna Gould (June 5, 1875 – November 30, 1961) was an American socialite and heiress as a daughter of financier Jay Gould.

Early life
Anna Gould was born on June 5, 1875, in New York City. She was the daughter of Jay Gould (1836–1892) and Helen Day Miller (1838–1889).  Her siblings included George Jay Gould I, Edwin Gould I, Helen Miller Gould, Howard Gould, and Frank Jay Gould.

Personal life

On March 14, 1895, she married Paul Ernest Boniface de Castellane (1867–1932), elder son and heir apparent of the Marquis of Castellane, in Manhattan, New York. He was commonly referred to as Boniface de Castellane with the nickname "Boni" and used the courtesy title of Count of Castellane (Comte de Castellane). Before their divorce, Boni and Anna had five children together:

 Marie Louise de Castellane (b. 1896)
 Boniface, Marquis de Castellane (1896–1946), who married Yvonne Patenôtre, a daughter of Jules Patenôtre and Eleanor Elverson, the daughter of James Elverson, owner of The Philadelphia Inquirer.
 Georges Paul Ernest de Castellane (1897/9–1944), who married Florinda Fernández Anchorena (1901-1995), owner at that time, of the Fernández Anchorena Palace in Buenos Aires. 
 Georges Gustave de Castellane (c. 1898–1946)
 Jay (Jason) de Castellane (1902-1956)

They divorced in 1906, after Boniface had spent about $10 million of her family's money. Boniface then sought an annulment from the Vatican in 1924. After several appeals the validity of the marriage was upheld.  On April 13, 1925, Time magazine wrote: "Probably not since Henry VIII tried in vain to get an annulment of his marriage with Catherine of Aragon has a matrimonial case been so long in the courts of the Roman Catholic Church as that on which nine Cardinals have just handed down a final decision."

In 1908, she married Boni's cousin, Hélie de Talleyrand-Périgord, Duc de Sagan (1859–1937), son of the dandy Boson de Talleyrand-Périgord.  As eldest son and heir to the Duke of Talleyrand, he was styled Marquis of Talleyrand-Périgord and Duke of Sagan. With Talleyrand, Anna had the following two children:

 Howard de Talleyrand-Périgord, Duc de Sagan (1909-1929), who took his own life when his parents refused him permission to marry until he was 21.
 Hélène Violette de Talleyrand-Périgord (1915-2003), who married Comte James Robert de Pourtalès on March 29, 1937, in Le Val-Saint-Germain.  They divorced in 1969 and on March 20, 1969, she married Gaston Palewski (1901–1984), former Minister of Scientific Research, Atomic Energy and Space Questions. She had Issue.

She returned to the United States four months before her death and died on December 8, 1961, in Paris. She is entombed in Passy Cemetery in Paris.

Descendants
Anna was a grandmother to Elisabeth de Castellane (1928-1991), who married Jean Bertrand Jacques Adrien Nompar Comte de Caumont La Force (1920-1986) in Paris on December 7, 1948.  She was also a grandmother to Diane Rose Anne Marie de Castellane (b. 1927), who married Philippe François Armand Marie Duc de Mouchy Prince-Duc de Poix (1922-2011) in Paris (civil ceremony) on April 14, 1948 (religious ceremony) on April 20, 1948.  After having children, they divorced on March 13, 1974.  She was also grandmother to Comte Hélie de Pourtalès who married, as her second husband, the eldest daughter of Princess Marie Clotilde Bonaparte.

Timelines 
1875 Birth of Anna Gould
1895 Marriage to Paul Ernest Boniface comte de Castellane (1867–1932), on March 14
1908 Marriage to Hélie de Talleyrand-Périgord
1929 Suicide of Howard de Talleyrand-Périgord, her son
1932 Death of Boniface de Castellane, her first husband
1932 Awarded the Cross of the French Legion of Honor
1937 Death of Hélie de Talleyrand-Périgord, her second husband
1939 Returns to the US and lives in Lyndhurst at her father's estate
1961 Death of Anna Gould

See also
Jenny Jerome, an American who married the Lord Randolph Churchill

References

External links
Anna Gould bibliography
Laure Hillerin, Pour le plaisir et pour le pire – la vie tumultueuse d'Anna Gould et Boni de Castellane, Paris, Flammarion, Nov. 2019. The only existing biography of Anna Gould. Read online

Further reading

New York Times; February 9, 1895; pg. 5; Count Castellane's lineage. His ancestors date from the Crusades and his father is wealthy.
New York Times; February 10, 1895; pg. 11; World of society: Engagement of Miss Anna Gould and Count Castellane. It is probable that the public, if not society, breathed a sigh of relief last week when it was finally, definitely, and conclusively announced that Miss Anna Gould, daughter of the late Jay Gould, was actually engaged to be married.
New York Times; March 5, 1895; pg. 1; Now a French Countess.
New York Times; January 19, 1897; pg. 7; Count Castellane's heir. A son born to the Countess early yesterday morning.
Covington Sun; April 16, 1908; 
New York Times; July 12, 1908; pg. SM1; The family in which Ann Gould married; Three French Dukedoms and a Prussian Principality belong to the Talleyrand-Périgords, Historic house which has already formed three American alliances. Jay Gould's youngest daughter, Anna, is the fourth American woman to marry into the historic house of Talleyrand-Périgord, one of the most ancient and illustrious families of the Old World, yet relatively little is known about it on this side of the Atlantic.
Time; April 13, 1925; Divorce
Time; December 12, 1932; Cross of the French Legion of Honor.
New York Times; October 27, 1937; pg. 31; Talleyrand dead; wed Anna Gould; Duke Was known as Prince of Sagan at time of courtship in first of century. Marie Pierre Camille Louis Hélie de Talleyrand-Périgord, Prince of Sagan and fifth Duke of Talleyrand, was a principal in one of the international marriage of the first decade of this century. He married Anna Gould, heir to more than $80,000,000 of the fortune of her father, the late Jay Gould, after she had divorced his cousin, Count Boni de Castellane.
Time; March 26, 1945; The Duchess de Talleyrand, 70, chic, spry daughter of the late financier Jay Gould, and a longtime (40 years) resident of prewar France, announced that she would auction off her famed collection of orchid plants—more than 5,000, valued at about $75,000—for the benefit of the Red Cross. In giving up the collection, which blooms in a two-block-long greenhouse on the Gould estate in Tarrytown, N.Y., the Duchess will save some 75 tons of coal for spring heating, can free nine gardeners for other work.
New York Times; November 30, 1961; pg. 37; Duchesse de Talleyrand Is Dead; youngest daughter of Jay Gould

1875 births
1961 deaths
American socialites
Annulment
Anna
House of Talleyrand-Périgord
Burials at Passy Cemetery
Chevaliers of the Légion d'honneur
People included in New York Society's Four Hundred